Jorge Ebanks (born March 2, 1986), is a Cayman Islands professional basketball player.  He currently plays for the Worthing Thunder club of the NBL.

He represented the Cayman Islands national basketball team at the 2015 FIBA CBC Championship where he was his team's best scorer, passer and stealer.

References

External links
 Eurobasket.com Profile
 Real GM Profile
 Jorge Ebanks 2015-2016 Highlights - Youtube.com video

1986 births
Living people
Caymanian men's basketball players
Point guards
Shooting guards